Saint Thomas Aquinas Cathedral is the mother church of the Roman Catholic Diocese of Reno, Nevada, United States. It is located at 310 W. 2nd Street in Reno. It was built in 1908 as the rise in Reno's Catholic population warranted a larger church. The cathedral was nearly destroyed by a fire in 1909 and was restored the following year. The cathedral complex was listed on the National Register of Historic Places in 2022.

History
On May 21, 1906, Catholic officials purchased the Sol Levy home at the corner of Second and Chestnut (now Arlington) streets in Reno for $10,000 to be the site of St. Thomas Aquinas Cathedral. The cornerstone was laid in June 1906 and the cathedral was dedicated June 21, 1908. A fire on December 21, 1909, caused major damage, including the collapse of the ceiling, but it was salvaged and reopened in 1910. In 1931, Pope Pius XI appointed the first Bishop of Reno as Thomas Kiely Gorman DD. D.Sc. Hist. which established the Diocese of Reno. The church became known as the cathedral and a bishop's chair was installed, that remains today. A renovation conducted in the 1950s added a wraparound mural that surrounds the altar. In 2010, an expansive retrofit was conducted to stabilize the foundation of the church.

The mural painting which adorns the sanctuary is considered to be one of the finest works of art of its kind in America. The mural was painted by Edith and Isabel Piczek, with the theme being the "Adoration of the Lamb of God, our Lord in the Blessed Eucharist." In the mural, the Saints of the Old Law, to the left, include Abel, Moses, Ruth, Abraham and Isaac, all in the presence of the Manna. Melchisedech, David, Nathan, Malachias, Anna the Prophetess and John the Baptist are also seen to the left of the Lamb of God. The saints of the New Law include Peter and John, with Paul in the background. Augustine of Hippo, Clare of Assisi, Charles Borromeo, Paschal Baylon and Pope Pius X, who urges a modern working family to take the sacrament of communion.

A variety of Diocesan priests ran the cathedral for years. The Dominican Order lived at the church and ran its programs from 1980 to 1986. From 1986 to June 2018, the Conventual Franciscans (OFM) of the St. Joseph of Cupertino Province also lived at and ran the cathedral.

On July 1, 2018, Reverend Charles (Chuck) Durante became the Rector of the Saint Thomas Aquinas Cathedral. The liturgical and canonical seat belonged to Bishop Randolph Calvo, DD, JCD, who appointed Fr. Durante, to return to the cathedral where he, as a youth received his first communion and confirmation. When Fr. Chuck became a new priest, he said his first mass at the cathedral. It was his home parish for over 35 years before he was assigned to be the new rector. Fr. Beda Martirez is the parochial vicar.

Gallery

See also
List of Catholic cathedrals in the United States
List of cathedrals in the United States
Sacred Heart Basilica, Timaru, New Zealand

References

External links 

Official cathedral site
Diocese of Reno official site

Roman Catholic churches completed in 1908
Thomas Aquinas, Cathedral of
Thomas Aquinas, Cathedral of
Churches in Reno, Nevada
Tourist attractions in Reno, Nevada
Neoclassical architecture in Nevada
1907 establishments in Nevada
20th-century Roman Catholic church buildings in the United States
Churches on the National Register of Historic Places in Nevada
National Register of Historic Places in Reno, Nevada
Neoclassical church buildings in the United States